Evelyne Viens (born 6 February 1997) is a Canadian professional soccer player who plays as a forward for Damallsvenskan club Kristianstads, on loan from National Women's Soccer League (NWSL) club NJ/NY Gotham FC, and the Canada national team. She played college soccer at the University of South Florida.

Early life
Viens began playing soccer at age five with AS Mistral Laurentien. At age 14, she received an invitation to join the Quebec provincial team, but declined the opportunity. She joined CS Haute-Saint-Charles, when she was 14.

College career
Viens played for the USF Bulls women's soccer team from 2016 to 2019, where she became the team's all-time top scorer with 73 goals and was named to the NCAA All-American team three times. She also holds the school record for the most single season goals and has the most career goals in American Athletic Conference history.

She scored her first collegiate goal on 25 August 2016 against Kentucky.

Club career

Early career 
In 2018 and 2019, she played for Dynamo de Quebec in the Première Ligue de soccer du Québec.

Gotham FC 
Viens was selected fifth overall by Sky Blue FC in the 2020 NWSL College Draft. She made her Sky Blue FC debut on 30 June 2020 in the 2020 NWSL Challenge Cup . Viens scored her first goal for the club on 22 July 2020, in a 3–2 defeat to the Chicago Red Stars during the semi-finals of the 2020 NWSL Challenge Cup.

Loan to Paris FC 
In August 2020, Viens was loaned to Paris FC. In March 2021, Viens returned to Sky Blue FC, who rebranded to NY/NJ Gotham FC the following month.

Loan to Kristianstads 
In December 2021, Viens was loaned to Damallsvenskan club Kristianstads for the 2022 season. On September 10, she scored four goals in a league match and a hat trick on September 24.

International career
She was named to the Canada national team for the first time for the 2021 SheBelieves Cup. She made her debut against the United States on 18 February. She scored her first goal for Canada on 9 April 2021 against Wales.

On 23 June 2021, she was named to the roster for the 2020 Summer Olympics, which were postponed until the summer of 2021 because of the COVID-19 pandemic. Canada won gold in the games, and Viens became the first USF alum to win an Olympic medal as an athlete.

International goals

Career statistics

Club

Honours
South Florida Bulls
 American Athletic Conference Champion: 2017-19
 Second Team All-American: 2019
 Third Team All-American: 2017-18
 Conference Offensive Player of the Year: 2018-19
 First Team All-Conference: 2017-19
Dynamo de Quebec
 Première Ligue de soccer du Québec champion: 2018
Canada
 Summer Olympics: 2021

Notes

References

External links
 South Florida profile
 
 

 

1997 births
Living people
French Quebecers
Canadian women's soccer players
People from Capitale-Nationale
Women's association football forwards
South Florida Bulls women's soccer players
NJ/NY Gotham FC draft picks
NJ/NY Gotham FC players
Canadian expatriate women's soccer players
Expatriate women's soccer players in the United States
Canadian expatriate sportspeople in the United States
National Women's Soccer League players
University of South Florida alumni
Canada women's international soccer players
Paris FC (women) players
Footballers at the 2020 Summer Olympics
Olympic soccer players of Canada
University of South Florida olympians
Olympic medalists in football
Medalists at the 2020 Summer Olympics
Olympic gold medalists for Canada